Alberto Nicasio (August 10, 1902 – July 4, 1980) was an Argentine artist (xylographer) and educator. He was a member of the Argentinian National Academy of Arts. A street in the city of Córdoba and a primary school in the province are named after him.

Biography

Alberto Nicasio was born in Marseille, France, on 10 August 1902, the son of Alfredo Nicasio and Eugenia Lasserre. As a young child, his parents decided to settle in the city of Oran, Algeria (then French territory); but due to the outbreak of the First World War, the family decided to emigrate to Argentina in 1916, finally settling in the city of Córdoba. There, Nicasio trained in drawing and painting at the Provincial School of Fine Arts with masters such as Emiliano Gómez Clara, Manuel Cardeñosa and Carlos Camiloni, and then began to study the technique of wood engraving. He married María Elena Las Heras in 1930; they had two daughters, María Elena and Carmen Olga.

As an artist, he participated in biennials in São Paulo, Mexico and Switzerland; he also participated in group exhibitions in the United States, Japan, Belgium, the Vatican, Spain, Chile, Uruguay and Brazil. He illustrated various books, such as Sarmiento's Facundo, José Hernández's Martín Fierro, Adonais, Percy Shelley's elegy and 30 woodcuts on William Henry Hudson's Tierra Purpúrea, among others. A number of exhibitions of his work were held posthumously.

Description of his work

Nicasio began experimenting with drawing and oil painting, and took part in group exhibitions in 1927 and 1928. Later, however, he abandoned his period as a painter and transitioned to woodcut, to which he dedicated the rest of his life.

Nicasio's oeuvre can be divided into periods in which his art varied. The first period was marked by a figurative character, depicting urban and suburban landscapes of Córdoba. These early engravings show the façades of buildings symbolic of Córdoba's colonial period, such as the Cathedral of Córdoba, or the buildings of the complex known as La Manzana Jesuítica, which includes the Compañía de Jesús and the Colegio Nacional de Montserrat. Also of note during this period were his landscape engravings such as La Cañada de Córdoba, as well as others such as the Barrancas de Córdoba and the old Suburbio Cordobés.

As a result of his interest in avant-garde art, he later began to experiment with geometrisation and abstract art. Thus, the following period of his work is characterised by a tendency towards abstraction, with simpler and more schematic forms, which would later evolve towards a more surrealist period.

A final period is characterised by the irruption of colour, in sharp contrast with his previous work in monochrome. At this stage, with the use of saturated inks (red, green and ochre), he approaches a neo-figurativism, but more synthetic and schematic.

Teaching

An important part of his life was his vocation as a teacher, in which he was dedicated to training successive generations of students. Some of them would later become renowned Argentine artists, such as Pedro Pont Vergés; Marcelo Bonevardi; Ronaldo de Juan; Alfio Grifasi; César Miranda, Raúl Pecker; José De Monte and Antonio Seguí, among others.

He taught in normal and secondary schools. He began teaching drawing at the Escuelas Pías (1931–1932) and at the Colegio Santo Tomás (1932–1942). Later, he was founder and director of the School of Engraving of the Society of Artists of Córdoba and professor of engraving at the Association of Painters and Sculptors of Córdoba (1939–1940). He founded the first engraving workshop in Córdoba at the Escuela Normal Superior Dr. Agulla (1942–1947). In 1950, he won the Chair of Engraving and later the directorship of the Escuela Superior de Artes (today the Faculty of Arts) of the National University of Córdoba.

Illustrated books

 Niobe, by Jorge M. Furt. [Buenos Aires, Argentina]: [Colombo], 1943. 
 Adonais. Elegy of Percy Shelley. [Córdoba, Argentina]: [Asociación Argentina de Cultura Británica]. 1944. 
 Doña Bárbara, by Rómulo Gallegos. [Buenos Aires, Argentina]: [Peuser], 1945. 
 San Martín, su lucha en verso, by Ana Rosa Tarrio. [Córdoba, Argentina]: [Biffignandi], 1947. 
 Martín Fierro, by José Hernández. [Buenos Aires, Argentina]: [Peuser], 1951. 
 El Salto de Ascochinga, Lucio Vicente López. [Buenos Aires, Argentina]: [Argentine Society of Bibliophiles], 1952. 
 Coral- Ese muro lejano, by Jorge M. Furt. [Buenos Aires, Argentina]: [Colombo], 1952. 
 Facundo, by Domingo Faustino Sarmiento. [Buenos Aires, Argentina]: [Peuser], 1955.

Permanent collections

 Museo Nacional de Bellas Artes (Buenos Aires)
 Museum of Fine Arts, La Plata 
 Vatican Museums
 Caraffa Fine Arts Museum
 Genaro Pérez Municipal Museum, Córdoba 
 Juan B. Castagnino Fine Arts Museum 
 Provincial Museum of Fine Arts, Santa Fe 
 Guiñazú Museum (Fader House), of Mendoza 
 Rosa Galisteo de Rodriguez Provincial Museum, Santa Fe

Exhibitions
 1937 Los Principios Newspaper, Córdoba 
 1938 Solo Exhibition at Reflex Gallery, Córdoba 
 1939 Rivadavia Library, Mendoza 
 1941 International Exhibition of Engraving, Riverside Museum of New York
 1942 Argentinean Association of English Culture, Córdoba 
 1942 Provincial Directorate of Tourism, Córdoba 
 1944 Argentinean-North American Cultural Institute, Córdoba 
 1944 Municipal Museum of Rosario, Santa Fe 
 1945 Exhibition of works by Argentinean engravers, Metropolitan Museum of New York, United States 
 1946 General Directorate of Tourism, Córdoba 
 1946 Exhibition of 10 engravings, National Salon of Montevideo, Uruguay
 1949 Panamerican Union, Washington D.C., USA  
 1949 Exhibition of Argentinean Engravers, National University of Chile, Chile
 1956 Avellaneda Art Museum, Buenos Aires, Argentina 
 1961 Exhibition of Argentinean Engravings, Japan 
 1963 Casa de la Cultura, Córdoba 
 1964 Feldman Gallery, Córdoba 
 1967 Feldman Gallery, Córdoba 
 1969 Historic Burlington County Prison Museum, New Jersey, United States 
 1970 Vatican Museum 
 1980 Posthumous Exhibition, Feldman Gallery, Córdoba
 1982 Municipal Museum of Fine Arts, Doctor Genaro Pérez, Córdoba 
 1984 Alberto Nicasio, Homage Exhibition, Agencia Diario Clarin, Córdoba 
 1985 Homage exhibition, Caraffa Museum, Córdoba 
 1988 Alberto Nicasio retrospective exhibition of woodcuts, Gaudí Gallery, Córdoba
 1989 National Radio Exhibition Hall, Córdoba 
 1989 Exhibition at the Independencia Foundation, Córdoba 
 1994 Churches of Córdoba: woodcuts by Alberto Nicasio, Museum of Religious Art Juan de Tejeda, Córdoba
 1995 Genaro Pérez Museum, Córdoba 
 1997 Xilographs by Alberto Nicasio, National Museum of Engraving, Buenos Aires

Awards and distinctions
 1933 Concejo Deliberante Award, I Salón de Otoño, Córdoba 
 1934 Acquisition Award, II Provincial Salon of Fine Arts, Córdoba 
 1935 National Senate Prize, III Autumn Salon, Córdoba 
 1936 Prize in Engraving, IV Salón de Otoño, Córdoba 
 1939 Laura Barberá de Díaz Award. Gold Medal. XXIX National Salon of Fine Arts, Buenos Aires 
 1941 First Prize in Engraving. National Salon of Fine Arts 
 1942 First Prize for Engraving. II Municipal Salon of Fine Arts, Córdoba 
 1942 Founding member of the Society of Plastic Artists of Córdoba
 1943 Acquisition Prize. Rosario Engraving Salon, Castagnino Museum
 1945 Salvador Caputto Award. XXII Annual Santa Fe Fine Arts Salon 
 1946 First Prize Alejandro Shaw, XXXI Salon of Watercolourists and Engravers, Buenos Aires 
 1946 Acquisition Prize. II Plastic Arts Salon of the Jockey Club of Córdoba
 1948 Secretary of Industry, Apprenticeship and Professional Orientation Award, II Salón del Trabajo. Municipal Museum of Fine Arts, Santa Fe
 1949 First Prize for Engraving. Autumn Exhibition, Córdoba 
 1950 First Prize, IX Mar del Plata Art Salon. Mar del Plata 
 1951 Prize in engraving, I Plastic Arts Salon, Córdoba 
 1951 Prins Grand Prize 1951. National Academy of Fine Arts
 1951 National University of Córdoba Award. Argentine Salon of Plastic Arts 
 1951 Grand Prize of Honour. National Ministry of Education 
 1952 First Prize in Engraving and Drawing, II Plastic Arts Salon, Córdoba 
 1953 First Prize, Municipal Salon of Plastic Arts, Córdoba
 1956 Grand Prize of Honour, National Salon of Fine Arts, Buenos Aires 
 1956 Medal Honorable Senate of the Nation. Gold Medal 
 1957 Grand Prize of Honour in Engraving. Mar del Plata Salon 
 1958 Medal, Brussels International Exhibition 
 1958 First Prize at the Santa Fe Salon 
 1960 First Prize. National Salon on Historical Art, Buenos Aires 
 1963 Grand Prize of Honour. Plastic Arts Salon of Córdoba 
 1968 Prize for Intellectual Production. Plastic Arts of Córdoba 
 1970 Second Prize in Engraving, III Annual Salon of APAC, Córdoba 
 1973 Member of the National Academy of Fine Arts

References

Bibliography

 Nicasio, Alberto; Grimaut, Azor. La Cañada. Estampas de Córdoba = La Cañada. Engravings of Cordoba. [Córdoba, Argentina]: [Litvack], 1944. 
 Nicasio, Alberto. Monumentos Coloniales de Córdoba = Colonial Monuments of Córdoba, prologued by Carlos Luque Colombres. [Córdoba, Argentina]: [Biffignandi], 1956. 
 Nicasio, Alberto. Iglesias de Córdoba; estampas xilográficas = Churches of Cordoba; xylographic engravings. [Córdoba, Argentina]: [Oficina del Album del VI Congreso Eucarístico Nacional], 1959. 
 Nicasio, Alberto. Capillas coloniales de Córdoba: 12 xilografias = Colonial chapels of Córdoba: 12 woodcuts. [Córdoba, Argentina]: [Universidad Nacional de Córdoba], 1961. Twelve woodcuts, and a prologue by Marcelo Montes Pacheco. 
 Nicasio, Alberto. Grabados de alumnos de la Escuela de Artes, Universidad Nacional de Córdoba = Engravings by students of the School of Arts, National University of Córdoba. [Córdoba, Argentina]: [Pabellón Méjico-Ciudad Universitaria], 1963. 
 Nicasio, Alberto. 30 Xilografías sobre motivos de La Tierra Purpúrea, de Guillermo Enrique Hudson. [Córdoba, Argentina]: [Litvack].
 Pan American Union. Three engravers of Argentina : Amadeo dell'Acqua, Alberto Nicasio, Victor Rebuffo. [Washingnton D.C., USA]: [The Union], 1949. 
 Pécora, Óscar and Barranco, Ulises. Sesenta y cinco grabados en madera. La xilografía en el Río de la Plata = Sixty-five wood engravings. Xylography in the River Plate. [Buenos Aires, Argentina]: [Plástica], 1943. 
 Rizzuto, Manuel Alfredo. Historia y evocación de Alta Gracia = History and evocation of Alta Gracia. [Córdoba, Argentina]: [Asociación Alta Gracia y sus Sierras], 1943.

External links
 Museo de la Escuela Normal Superior: la Historia de nuestra escuela
 Museo de la Escuela Normal Superior: Taller de xilografía inaugurado por Alberto Nicasio
 "Sistematización del arroyo la Cañada en la Ciudad de Córdoba (1939-1944). Impacto en el campo del arte: pintura", Sabatté, Antonio E. FAUD-UNC, Córdoba, Argentina
 "Impresiones sociales. Una lectura sobre la tradición del grabado en la Argentina", Dolinko, Silvia. Revista Separata. Facultad de Humanidades y Artes. Universidad Nacional de Rosario, 19 de noviembre de 2010.
 "Las invasiones a La Cañada. Acciones colectivas de artistas en los tiempos de la sistematización", Alderete, Ana Sol. Revista Separata. Facultad de Humanidades y Artes. Universidad Nacional de Rosario, 26 de octubre de 2016.
 Ediciones ilustradas de la Sociedad de Bibliófilos Argentinos en repositorios institucionales. Costa, María Eugenia. FaHCE, IHAAA/FBA, UNLP

1902 births
1980 deaths
20th-century Argentine painters
20th-century engravers
Argentine artists
Argentine male painters
Argentine engravers
Artists from Marseille
Academic staff of the National University of Córdoba
People from Córdoba, Argentina
People from Oran
Wood engravers
20th-century Argentine male artists